DYAB may refer to:
 DYAB-AM, an AM radio station broadcasting in Cebu City, branded as Radyo Patrol
 DYAB-FM, an FM radio station broadcasting in Tacloban, branded as Kaboses Radio
 DYAB-TV, a TV station broadcasting in Tacloban, branded as ABS-CBN Tacloban